
Gmina Dobrzany is an urban-rural gmina (administrative district) in Stargard County, West Pomeranian Voivodeship, in north-western Poland.

The gmina contains part of the protected area called Ińsko Landscape Park.

Villages
Apart from the town of Dobrzany, Gmina Dobrzany contains the villages and settlements of Biała, Błotno, Bytowo, Dolice, Grabnica, Kępno, Kielno, Kozy, Krzemień, Lutkowo, Mosina, Odargowo, Ognica, Okole, Sierakowo and Szadzko.

Neighbouring gminas
Gmina Dobrzany is bordered by the gminas of Chociwel, Drawsko Pomorskie, Ińsko, Kalisz Pomorski, Marianowo, Recz and Suchań.

References
Polish official population figures 2006

Dobrzany
Stargard County